George Patching (15 September 1886 – 31 March 1944) was a South African sprinter. He competed in the men's 100 metres at the 1912 Summer Olympics.

References

External links
 

1886 births
1944 deaths
Athletes (track and field) at the 1912 Summer Olympics
South African male sprinters
Olympic athletes of South Africa
People from Queenstown, South Africa
Cape Colony people
Sportspeople from the Eastern Cape